USS Falcon may refer to the following ships of the United States Navy:

 , the Mexican gunboat Isabel, captured in 1846 and taken into the Navy; decommissioned and sold, 1848
 Falcon, a motor boat, served in a noncommissioned status in the 13th Naval District during World War I

See also
 Falcon was the name of the Lunar Module on Apollo 15

United States Navy ship names